Roxana Daniela Dumitrescu (later Toader, born 27 June 1967) is a retired Romanian foil fencer who won a team bronze medal at the 1992 Olympics.

References

External links
 

1967 births
Living people
Romanian female fencers
Olympic fencers of Romania
Fencers at the 1992 Summer Olympics
Olympic bronze medalists for Romania
People from Urziceni
Olympic medalists in fencing
Medalists at the 1992 Summer Olympics
Romanian foil fencers
20th-century Romanian women